LivePerson is a global technology company that develops conversational commerce and AI software.

Headquartered in New York City, LivePerson is best known as the developer of the Conversational Cloud, a software platform that allows consumers to message with brands.

In 2018, the company announced its AI offering, allowing customers to create AI-powered chatbots to answer consumer messages, alongside human customer service staff.

History
LivePerson was founded in 1995 by Robert LoCascio. In April 2000, the company completed an initial public offering on the NASDAQ, in March 2011 its shares started trading also on the Tel Aviv Stock Exchange and are included in the TA-100 Index and the TA BlueTech Index.

Since its founding, LivePerson expanded to include offices in UK, Israel, Australia,  Germany, Netherlands, Italy, France and Japan. It has since closed all offices in favor of remote working.

LivePerson provides a web based engagement service, also referred to as click to chat.

Acquisitions

Products and services 

 The Conversational Cloud — A cloud-based method of customer messaging. Business can communicate with customers on web, mobile, and social.
 LP Insights — Turns customers' chat transcripts into structured and unstructured data to provide actionable insights.

See also
 Tech companies in the New York metropolitan area

References

External links

Software companies based in New York City
Online companies of the United States
Web analytics
Cloud applications
2000 initial public offerings
Instant messaging
Software companies of the United States
1995 establishments in New York City
Software companies established in 1995
Companies listed on the New York Stock Exchange
Companies listed on the Tel Aviv Stock Exchange
Publicly traded companies based in New York City